Plectronoceras is the earliest known shelled cephalopod, dating to the Late Cambrian. None of the fossils are complete, and none show the apex or aperture of the shell. Approximately half of its shell was filled with septa; 7 were recorded in a  shell.  Its shell contains transverse septa separated by about half a millimetre, with a siphuncle on its concave side. Its morphology matches closely to that hypothesised for the last common ancestor of all cephalopods.

Plectronoceras is the type genus of the family Plectronoceratidae. Fossils of Plectronoceras have been found in the San Saba Limestone of Texas.

References 

Prehistoric nautiloid genera
Cambrian molluscs
Cambrian animals of North America
Cambrian United States

Fossil taxa described in 1933

Cambrian genus extinctions